Robert Harper Odell (March 5, 1922 – December 15, 2012) was an American football player who, as a college senior at the University of Pennsylvania, won the Maxwell Award in 1943.  In 1944 he was drafted in the second round (15th overall) by the Chicago-Pittsburgh Cardinals-Steelers but served in the United States Navy from 1944 through 1946.  The Pittsburgh Steelers offered Odell $8,000 to play for the 1946 season.  However, his doctor recommended that he give up football due to a knee injury suffered while playing basketball.  He was the head football coach at the University of Pennsylvania in the late 1960s and at Williams College from 1971 to 1986.  With a record of 75–49–4 in 16 years as the head coach at Williams, Odell ranks third in career wins behind Dick Farley and Charlie Caldwell.  He was elected to the College Football Hall of Fame in 1992.

He died of kidney disease in a nursing home in 2012.

Head coaching record

References

External links
 

1922 births
2012 deaths
American football halfbacks
Bucknell Bison football coaches
Card-Pitt players
Penn Quakers football players
Penn Quakers football coaches
Temple Owls football coaches
Williams Ephs football coaches
Wisconsin Badgers football coaches
Yale Bulldogs football coaches
All-American college football players
College Football Hall of Fame inductees
Maxwell Award winners
People from Corning, Iowa
Coaches of American football from Iowa
Players of American football from Iowa
United States Navy personnel of World War II